

Class of 2007

|-
| colspan="7" style="padding-left:10px;" | Overall Recruiting Rankings:     Scout – 13     Rivals – 2       ESPN –
|}

Roster

Schedule

Rankings reflect the USA Today Coaches Poll.

Regular season

Pacific-10 tournament
In the 2008 Pacific-10 Conference men's basketball tournament, the Trojans lost to UCLA, featuring Kevin Love, in the semi-finals. Both Mayo and Love were selected to the All-Pac-10 tournament team. In his NCAA tournament debut with the Trojans, Mayo scored 20 points as USC was beaten by Kansas State and freshman Michael Beasley.

Quarterfinals (March 13)
UCLA 88, California 66
Semifinals (March 14)
UCLA 57, USC 54

NCAA tournament
Seeding in brackets
Midwest
Kansas State (11) 80, Southern California (6) 67

Awards and honors
O. J. Mayo, All-Pac-10 tournament team

Team players drafted into the NBA

Punishment for NCAA rules violations
On January 3, 2010, USC announced it would punish the Men's Basketball Program for rules violations committed in the 2007–2008 season, when O. J. Mayo attended USC and Tim Floyd was still the head coach. Mayo received improper benefits in violation of NCAA rules while at USC, and Floyd was found to have assisted in the obtainment of these improper benefits. USC has declared Mayo was therefore ineligible to play in 2007–2008, and as a result, USC has vacated all wins from the 2007–2008 regular season, dropping their record to 1–32. The one win would be over Arizona State during the Pac-10 Conference tournament, as USC has only announced the vacation of all wins from the 2007–2008 regular season.* 

Since the initial announcement reported by ESPN, USC clarified that all wins during the 2007–2008 season, including any wins during the Pac-10 Conference tournament, would be vacated and not forfeited, meaning USC's record for 2007–2008 is 0–12, not 1–32 as previously reported. Vacated wins result in no win/loss application for the team vacating the win, unlike a forfeit, in which the forfeiting team is charged with a loss, and its opponent awarded a victory.

Noel M. Ragsdale, law professor, University of Southern California, is the chair of the five-member Division I Infractions Appeals Committee, which hears and acts on the findings of major violations by the Division I Committee on Infractions.

References

USC Trojans
USC Trojans men's basketball seasons
USC
USC Trojans
USC Trojans